Mareme Diop Yally (born 26 May 1988) is a Senegalese footballer who plays as a midfielder. She has been a member of the Senegal women's national team.

International career
Yally capped for Senegal at senior level during the 2012 African Women's Championship.

References

1988 births
Living people
Women's association football midfielders
Senegalese women's footballers
Senegal women's international footballers